HEC-RAS is a computer program that models the hydraulics of water flow through natural rivers and other channels.  Prior to the 2016 update to Version 5.0, the program was one-dimensional, meaning that there is no direct modeling of the hydraulic effect of cross section shape changes, bends, and other two- and three-dimensional aspects of flow. The release of Version 5.0 introduced two-dimensional modeling of flow as well as sediment transfer modeling capabilities. The program was developed by the United States Army Corps of Engineers in order to manage the rivers, harbors, and other public works under their jurisdiction; it has found wide acceptance by many others since its public release in 1995.

The Hydrologic Engineering Center (HEC) in Davis, California, developed the River Analysis System (RAS) to aid hydraulic engineers in channel flow analysis and floodplain determination.  It includes numerous data entry capabilities, hydraulic analysis components, data storage and management capabilities, and graphing and reporting capabilities.

Functionality 
The basic computational procedure of HEC-RAS for steady flow is based on the solution of the one-dimensional energy equation. Energy losses are evaluated by friction and contraction / expansion. The momentum equation may be used in situations where the water surface profile is rapidly varied. These situations include hydraulic jumps, hydraulics of bridges, and evaluating profiles at river confluences.

For unsteady flow, HEC-RAS solves the full, dynamic, 1-D Saint Venant Equation using an implicit, finite difference method. The unsteady flow equation solver was adapted from Dr. Robert L. Barkau's UNET package.

HEC-RAS is equipped to model a network of channels, a dendritic system or a single river reach. Certain simplifications must be made in order to model some complex flow situations using the HEC-RAS one-dimensional approach.  It is capable of modeling subcritical, supercritical, and mixed flow regime flow along with the effects of bridges, culverts, weirs, and structures.

Version 5.0.7 as of March 2019 supports Windows 7, 8, 8.1, and 10 64-bit only.

Usages 
HEC-RAS is a computer program for modeling water flowing through systems of open channels and computing water surface profiles. HEC-RAS finds particular commercial application in floodplain management and [flood insurance] studies to evaluate floodway encroachments. Some of the additional uses are: bridge and culvert design and analysis, levee studies, and channel modification studies. It can be used for dam breach analysis, though other modeling methods are presently more widely accepted for this purpose.

Advantages 
HEC-RAS has merits, notably its support by the US Army Corps of Engineers, the future enhancements in progress, and its acceptance by many government agencies and private firms. It is in the public domain and peer-reviewed, and available to download free of charge from HEC's web site. Various private companies are registered as official "vendors" and offer consulting services and add-on software. Some also distribute the software in countries that are not permitted to access US Army web sites. However, the direct download from HEC includes extensive documentation, and scientists and engineers versed in hydraulic analysis should have little difficulty utilizing the software.

Disadvantages 
Users may find numerical instability problems during unsteady analyses, especially in steep and/or highly dynamic rivers and streams. It is often possible to use HEC-RAS to overcome instability issues on river problems.

Version history 
The first version of HEC-RAS was released in 1995. This HEC-RAS 1.0 solves the same numerical equation of the 1968 HEC-2.

GeoHECRAS 
GeoHECRAS is a 2D/3D visualization and editing data wrapper to the HEC-RAS software and used for flood control and flood mitigation engineering studies, including production of Federal Emergency Management Agency flood hazard maps and other river engineering studies.

Features related to HEC-RAS include:
 Undo and redo HEC-RAS editing
 Multiple document interface (MDI) of HEC-RAS projects
 Use of AutoCAD and MicroStation CAD drawings and terrain surfaces
 Use of GIS databases
 Automated cross section generation
 Automated production of floodplain maps
 Design and analysis of roadway crossings (bridge and culvert)
 Adaptive 2D mesh generation

WMS 

WMS (watershed modeling system) is a hydrology software that provides pre and post-processing tools for use with HEC-RAS. The development of WMS by Aquaveo was funded primarily by The United States Army Corps of Engineers.

Features related to HEC-RAS include:

 Using feature objects (centerline, cross section lines) and a TIN to develop the geometry of a HEC-RAS model.
 Editing, merging, and creating cross sections in a database for use with HEC-RAS and other hydraulic models.
 Delineating flood plains from water surface elevation data. Water surface elevations can be computed by HEC-RAS, defined interactively, or imported from a file.
 Linking multiple simulations of HEC-1 to HEC-RAS to determine the uncertainty in modeling parameters on a delineated flood plain. Curve Number and Precipitation can be stochastically varied among HEC-1 parameters and Manning's n value for HEC-RAS.

See also
Hydraulic engineering

References

External links 

HEC-RAS home page  at the US Army Corps of Engineers, Hydrologic Engineering Center
 An output video of a flood analysis done with HEC-RAS and visualization in ArcGIS
 GeoHECRAS Homepage at CivilGEO
 https://www.hec.usace.army.mil/software/hec-ras/download.aspx

Hydraulic engineering
Scientific simulation software
Hydrology software